Stefano Podestà (born 1 August 1939) is a retired Italian academic. He was the vice-rector of Bocconi University in Milan before involving in politics. He served as the minister of university, scientific and technological research in the first cabinet of Prime Minister Silvio Berlusconi. Podestà was appointed to the post in May 1994 being one of the Northern League members in the cabinet. He replaced Umberto Colombo in the post. During his term Podestà attempted to reform the established ways of appointments of academics. Giorgio Salvini replaced Podestà in the post of minister of university, scientific and technological research. In 2011 Podestà was given the title of the emeritus professor in the field of management and technology at the University of Bocconi.

He has been author and editor of various books and articles.

References

External links

20th-century Italian politicians
1939 births
Education ministers of Italy
Academic staff of Bocconi University
Management scientists
Lega Nord politicians
Living people